Colorado's 2nd congressional district is a congressional district in the U.S. state of Colorado. The district is located in the north-central part of the state and encompasses the northwestern suburbs of Denver including Boulder and Fort Collins. The district also includes the mountain towns of Vail, Granby, Steamboat Springs, and Idaho Springs. Redistricting in 2011 moved Larimer County, including the cities of Fort Collins and Loveland, to the 2nd from the 4th district. Meanwhile, redistricting in 2021 moved Loveland back to the 4th district and Broomfield and western Jefferson County to the 7th district.

The district is currently represented by Democrat Joe Neguse. He was elected in 2018 to replace Jared Polis, who retired after being elected governor of Colorado.

History

1890s
Following the 1890 U.S. census and associated reapportionment of seats in the United States House of Representatives, Colorado gained a second congressional district. The first representative elected to this district was John Calhoun Bell of The Populist party.

1990s
Following the 1990 U.S. census and associated realignment of Colorado congressional districts, the 2nd congressional district consisted of Boulder, Clear Creek, and Gilpin counties, as well as portions of Adams, and Jefferson counties.

2000s
Following the 2000 U.S. census and associated realignment of Colorado congressional districts, the 2nd congressional district consisted of Broomfield, Clear Creek, Eagle, Gilpin, Grand, and Summit counties, as well as portions of Adams, Boulder, Jefferson, and Weld counties.

2010s
Following the 2010 U.S. census and associated realignment of Colorado congressional districts, the 2nd congressional district consisted of Broomfield, Clear Creek, Gilpin, Grand and Summit counties; most of Boulder and Jefferson counties; and portions of Eagle, Larimer and Weld counties. Following the census, the 2nd district stretched further north to the Wyoming border while losing the western portion of Eagle County.

2020s

Voting

Characteristics
This district is anchored in Boulder and Larimer counties which have the bulk of population in the district: both counties are mainly anchored by the large college towns of Boulder and Fort Collins, providing Democratic strength in the district.

The other parts of the district are diverse, ranging from far western Denver suburbs to agricultural areas and mountain towns. Eagle and Summit counties, home to the ski resort towns of Vail and Breckenridge and other tourism dependent towns such as Avon, Frisco and Silverthorne, are Democratic strongholds: however Gilpin and Clear Creek counties, while also being tourism dependent and Democratic leaning, do not vote as strongly for the Democrats. Grand County leans Republican, though the ski resort areas of the county in Winter Park are heavily Democratic.

The suburban areas of Denver represented in the 2nd district are more competitive; while Broomfield itself leans Democratic, the Jefferson County foothills are historically a Republican stronghold, though urban sprawl is eroding Republican dominance in the area. Similarly, Larimer County outside of Fort Collins is heavily Republican, however the county leans Democratic due to the influence and population of Fort Collins.

List of members representing the district

Previous election results

2002

2004

2006

2008

2010

2012

2014

2016

2018

2020

2022

Historical district boundaries

See also

 Colorado's congressional districts
 List of United States congressional districts

References

 
 
 Congressional Biographical Directory of the United States 1774–present

2
Adams County, Colorado
Boulder County, Colorado
Broomfield, Colorado
Clear Creek County, Colorado
Eagle County, Colorado
Gilpin County, Colorado
Grand County, Colorado
Jefferson County, Colorado
Summit County, Colorado
Weld County, Colorado
1893 establishments in Colorado